Fugitive Mind is a 1999 American sci-fi action film directed by Fred Olen Ray and starring Michael Dudikoff and Heather Langenkamp.

Plot
A man finds out that he was brainwashed to kill an important government official.

Cast
Michael Dudikoff as Robert Dean
Heather Langenkamp as Suzanne Hicks
Michele Greene as Robyn
David Hedison as Senator Davis
Ian Ogilvy as Dr. Grace
Judson Earney Scott as Karns
Chick Vennera as Jimmy Morabito
Gabriel Dell as Tucker Foley
John Putch as Dave Bayne
Barry Newman as Dr. Chamberlain

Release
The film had a direct-to-video release in 1999.

Reception
The film has been met with generally mixed reviews. Keith Baley of Radio Times criticized the storyline and the pacing of the film stating, "Plagued by nightmares and flashbacks to events he cannot remember, Michael Dudikoff takes much longer than the audience to realise he's not who he thinks he is, and even longer to find out he's the key element of a planned assassination in this Total Recall inspired thriller. Suspect Device did something similar to this four years earlier (even using one of the same key locations), and at least did it with some zip and crowd-pleasing action. Though director Fred Olen Ray makes this look better than his usual efforts, it's an endless talkfest that becomes as numbing as the many faces that get punched in the course of the movie - which is about as exciting as the action gets."

References

External links
Fugitive Mind at Internet Movie Database
Fugitive Mind at Rotten Tomatoes

1990s science fiction action films
Films directed by Fred Olen Ray
American science fiction action films
1999 direct-to-video films
1999 films
1990s English-language films
1990s American films